Arjun Malhotra (born 7 January 1949) is an Indian entrepreneur, industrialist and philanthropist. In 1975, Malhotra co-founded HCL Group, where he served as vice chairman. He also founded TechSpan and served as chief executive officer of US-based firm Headstrong after the two companies merged. He also co-founded SPIC MACAY along with his college friend Kiran Seth for the promotion of Indian music and culture amongst youth.

Personal life and education

Malhotra was born to an Army man and doctor mother in 1949 in Kolkata in a family of migrants from Peshawar and Lahore. He did his nursery schooling in Loreto which was close to his house in Park Mansions on Ripon Street, Calcutta. After his father got transferred to Delhi and passing away of his maternal grandfather, a scientist who was president of Indian Science Congress in 1954; the family shifted to New Delhi where he did his schooling in St. Columba's School and then high school from Doon School, Dehradun. He joined IIT, Kharagpur in 1965 for his degree in Electronics and Electrical Communications. He came to United States to do Advanced Management Program at Harvard Business School. He has a younger sister, who is into academics. He married his wife Kiran at 22. He has a son Shiven Malhotra (b.1974) and daughter Poorva (b.1977). He shuttles between New Delhi and Saratoga, California.

Career
Malhotra started his career in 1970, when he joined Delhi Cloth Mills as Senior Management Trainee. In 1972 along with Shiv Nadar he was assigned to set up marketing division for DCM Data Patterns to sell pocket calculators. In 1975, he quit DCM and partnered with Shiv Nadar, Ajai Chowdhry, D.S. Puri, Yogesh Vaidya and Subhash Arora to set up a company known as Microcomp Limited, which sold digital calculators, eventually becoming its Vice Chairman. Microcomp created a joint sector company named Hindustan Computers Limited and began manufacturing mini and microcomputers. He led the company's joint venture with Hewlett Packard in India and also companys Hong Kong, Australia, and New Zealand business operations. He took over HCL's US operation in 1989.

Malhotra, along with Sandeep Sahai, Nagesh Mehra, Puneet Pushkarna, Aloke Paskar, Curt Terwilliger, Harsh Lohit, Adarsh Mehra, and Bonnie Singh started his IT consulting company TechSpan in 1998 with funding from Goldman Sachs and Walden. He later merged the company with IT services company Headstrong in 2003, and became that company's CEO. HeadStrong was later acquired by Genpact for US$550 million in 2011. Malhotra was described by Business Today as a "serial technology entrepreneur" who "was ahead of the learning curve" with each of his companies. He setup Magic Software, a software company in 2011. He serves as director for various other companies including Lumis Partners, Evolko Inc, Mapmygenome and Number Theory Software, an artificial intelligence and data science solution provider.

He is Chairman of Board of Vision 2020, an IIT Alumni lead initiative to help IIT raise endowment funds. He is on Board of Governors of IIT - Foundation (Kharagpur), Indian School of Business Hyderabad, IIM Udaipur, IIM Shillong. member of Indian Public Schools Society that runs the Doon School. He is also Executive Council member of NASSCOM.

Philanthropy

Malhotra founded Prof G S Sanyal School of Telecommunications and Prof M N Faruqui Center for Innovation at IIT (Kharagpur). He also co-founded SPIC MACAY along with his college friend Kiran Seth for the promotion of Indian music and culture amongst youth.

Awards and honors

 Malhotra was awarded the Albert Einstein Technology Medal in 2001. 
 In 2003, he was named a Life Fellow by IIT Kharagpur, and later awarded the Doctor of Science (Honoris Causa) by the university in 2012. 
 In 2013, he received an Honorary Doctorate from Punjab Technical University.
 Dataquest Lifetime Achievement Award in 2018.
 Malhotra was hosted by IIT Bhubaneswar for motivational talk on "E-Day" on 17 September 2018.
 Dr. B.C. Roy Gold Medal.

References

IIT Kharagpur alumni
Living people
1949 births
Businesspeople in software
Indian chief executives
Indian billionaires
20th-century Indian businesspeople
Businesspeople from Kolkata
The Doon School alumni